Bence Majoros (born 28 July 1997) is a Hungarian table tennis player. He competed in the 2020 Summer Olympics.

References

1997 births
Living people
Sportspeople from Budapest
Table tennis players at the 2020 Summer Olympics
Hungarian male table tennis players
Olympic table tennis players of Hungary
21st-century Hungarian people